Xm or XM may refer to:

 XM Satellite Radio, a US and Canadian radio company now merged into Sirius XM Holdings.
 XM (file format), a computer file format for music
 XM (album), a live-in-studio album recorded by Porcupine Tree
 BMW XM, an upcoming full-size luxury performance SUV
 Citroën XM, a discontinued executive car made by Citroën
 C.A.I. First or Alitalia Express (IATA code XM, 1997-2005), an Italian airline
 A nonstandard Roman numeral for 990 (standard is CMXC)
(6903) 1989 XM, a main belt minor planet
Cross-matching of blood products

See also
 Includes several weapons and other military hardware
 Includes many shows broadcast on XM